The New Jersey Lottery is run by the U.S. state of New Jersey. Its In-house draw games are: Pick-3, Pick-4, Jersey Cash 5, Pick-6, Quick Draw, and Cash Pop. Its multi-jurisdictional draw games are: Cash4Life, Mega Millions, and Powerball. The Lottery also sells Fast Play and scratch-off tickets. The New Jersey Lottery is headquartered at One Lawrence Park Complex in Lawrence Township, Mercer County.

The largest prize won on a ticket sold in New Jersey was for the March 30, 2018, Mega Millions drawing. The annuity value of the ticket was approximately $533,000,000. The ticket was sold in Riverdale, Morris County.

Current draw games

In-house draw games

Pick-3
Pick-3 is a three-digit draw game drawn twice daily. It began on May 22, 1975, as a daily game; midday drawings were introduced in November 2001. It was originally known as Pick-it; the name changed to Pick-3 in 1987 to distinguish from the newer Pick-4 game.

The ways to win, in the order of payouts from highest to lowest, are:

Straight - Matching all three digits exactly as they are drawn. Minimum play is 50 cents.
Wheel - Match all three digits in any order and win the straight payout. Minimum play is $1.50 (if two digits are the same, such as 211) or $3.00 for three different digits (such as 123.)
Box - Matching all three digits in any order. Minimum play is 50 cents.
Pair - A two-digit wager; either the first and second digits, or the second and third (last.)
Split - Also a two-digit wager, but with the first and last digits. Minimum play is 50 cents.

Typically, the straight payout is over $250, and the box payout (where the three digits are different) averages $38. Unlike most lotteries, New Jersey pays winners of Pick-3 and Pick-4 on a parimutuel basis. Multiple wagers of the same number increase winnings. The most common Pick-3 wager is Straight and Box combined for $1.00 (sometimes known as a "50-50" bet.)

Pick-4
Pick-4 is a four-digit draw game also drawn twice daily. It was introduced as a weekly game on July 9, 1977, became a daily game, and has been a twice-daily game since November 2001.

The ways to win, in the order of payouts from highest to lowest, are:

Straight - Matching all four digits exactly. Minimum play is 50 cents.
Box - Matching all four digits in any order. Minimum play is 50 cents.

As in Pick-3, the most common Pick-4 wager is Straight and Box combined for $1.00 (some players will make separate "straight" and "box" wagers for the same Pick-4 number, so that the "box" wager, if won, can be collected without filling out a tax form.) Typically, the straight payout is over $2,000. Multiple wagers of the same number increase winnings.

Fireball
On February 27, 2017, the Fireball feature was added to Pick-3 and Pick-4, replacing a play type that the NJ Lottery offered until February 19, 2017, called “So Close”. This Fireball  feature gives players an additional opportunity to create winning combinations. With Fireball, players can replace one of the Lottery drawn Pick-3 or Pick-4 winning numbers with the Fireball number drawn for more ways to win, for example, if a player placed a 3-6-8 Straight bet and the winning numbers were 2-6-8 and the Fireball number was 3, the player would swap out the first number 2 with the Fireball number to match the numbers 3-6-8 and win the Fireball prize. In addition, player matching the winning numbers for their play type and the fireball number is the same as one of their numbers and the player matches the winning fireball combinations win the base game and any fireball prizes for each fireball combination for that play type (for example if a player placed a 1-2-2-7 Straight bet with the fireball feature and the winning numbers were 1-2-2-7 and the fireball number was 2, he/she would win 3 times). Adding Fireball doubles the cost of the play and can be added to any pick 3 or pick 4 play type.

Jersey Cash 5 Xtra
Jersey Cash 5 is a daily game that draws five balls numbered from 1 through 45. Drawings are held nightly, and the cost is $1 per game. The top prize (matching all 5 numbers drawn) is a progressive jackpot that starts at an estimated $100,000. The jackpot increases each day until a wager matches all 5 numbers drawn. The jackpot amount is shared between each winning ticket if there is more than one.

Jersey Cash 5 began on September 20, 1992, as a pick-5-of-38 game. Players won a parimutuel prize by matching at least three numbers. The original version of Jersey Cash 5 did not have a rolling jackpot; instead, if no set of five numbers was a perfect match, the first-prize pool was added to second prize winners (those who matched four of five numbers.) In September 2003, two numbers were added to make Jersey Cash 5 a 5/40 game, and the top prize level was changed to a progressive jackpot. On September 14, 2014, Jersey Cash 5 increased its field of numbers from 40 to 43 and became a 5/43 game. Its estimated starting jackpot prize was also increased - from $50,000 to $75,000. On June 29, 2020, the starting jackpot was increased from $75,000 to $100,000 and increased its field of numbers from 43 to 45.

On October 3, 2016, the "Xtra" feature was added to Jersey Cash 5. This feature gives players the opportunity to multiply their non-jackpot winnings up to 5 times by matching 3 or 4 out of 5 numbers. If a player matches 2 out of 5 numbers with the "Xtra" feature, they win $2.

Pick-6
Pick-6 is drawn on Monday and Thursday evenings. It draws six numbers from 1 through 46. Games cost $2 each. The jackpot begins at $2 million annuity and increases by at least $100,000 per rollover until there is a 6-of-6 winner (the jackpot prize is paid in a financial annuity over 30 years or the jackpot winner can choose the available cash option for such annuity). The game requires players to choose how they want to be paid if they win the jackpot prize while playing the game.

Pick-6 began on May 9, 1980, as one of the first games of its kind in the US. It originally was a pick-6 (hence the name) of 39 numbers. Players paid $1 for each game; a winning ticket needed at least four correct numbers in a game. It later went to a 6/42 matrix, followed by an additional change to 6/46; making even higher jackpots possible. Until 2000, drawings included a five-digit "bonus" number; an exact match entered the player into a special drawing where the top prize was $50,000 yearly in 20 installments, with no cash option. (Although the Pick-6 cash option began in 1997, it applied only to the "regular" game; choosing "cash" on a betslip, then winning the top prize in the "bonus" drawing, still meant receiving mandatory annuity payments.)

In September 2000, Pick-6 adopted the 6/49 format, adding a $3 prize for matching three numbers. Matching at least four numbers has always won a parimutuel prize.

On January 15, 2015, Pick-6 added its "XTRA" option (an additional $1 per play per drawing.) Matching five, four, or three of the six numbers means the basic parimutuel prize is multiplied by the "XTRA" number. Matching two numbers wins back the $2 wager.

On April 7, 2022, the game matrix scaled back to the 6/46 matrix, the price increased to $2 per play and a new feature called Double Play added to the game, giving players additional chance to win up to $250,000, with other prizes being reduced. In addition to that, the XTRA multiplier turned into an instant multiplier on every purchased ticket, and a new 10x multiplier number added, which gives players the chance to multiply any non jackpot prizes up to 10 times, both for the regular Pick-6 and Double Play drawings.

Quick Draw
Quick Draw is a keno-style draw game which was launched on July 17, 2017. The game is drawn every four minutes from 5:00 a.m. to 2:00 a.m. Players choose 1 to 10 numbers (spots) per play. It is drawn using a random number generator (RNG). The RNG draws 20 numbers from 1 through 80. Minimum play is $1. The 10-spot option has a top prize of $100,000 ($1 million on a $10 play). Players also have the option of how many consecutive drawings (up to 20) they wish to play. Up until September 30, 2018, Quick Draw was only offered at a limited number of lottery retailers (who have an HDTV monitor) showing each drawing.

On October 1, 2018, Quick Draw's Bullseye feature was launched giving players higher chances of winning. During each drawing, one of the 20 drawn numbers is randomly selected as the Bullseye number. If a player matches the Bullseye number, bigger prizes are won. Players can add Bullseye to each play for double the amount of the bet per draw. On the same day, the Quick Draw ePlayslip was also launched where players can generate a bet slip by selecting their own numbers and bets through the NJ Lottery app. Quick Draw is available through all New Jersey Lottery retailers, with the live drawings displayed on each lottery terminal, HDTV monitors, the NJ Lottery app and website.

On June 7, 2021, the Multiplier feature was launched. This feature gives lottery players the opportunity to multiply their winnings up to 10 times. The Multiplier drawing takes place prior to each draw. The cost to add the Multiplier to each play costs double the wager.

Cash Pop
The game launched on September 30, 2019. Players select how much to wager; $1, $2, $5, or $10. Players choose from 1 to 15 numbers; the "cover all" option guarantees a win. One number from 1 through 15 is drawn by an RNG. Players can win anywhere from 5 to 250 times their wager, with prizes ranging from $5 to $2,500. Winning numbers are shown on each lottery terminal, HDTV monitors, the New Jersey Lottery app, and website. Starting on Monday June 27, cash pop drawings take place every 4 minutes instead of every 15 minutes to allow for more excitement in the game.

Multi-jurisdictional games

Cash4Life

On June 13, 2014, New York and New Jersey began sales of Cash4Life, which replaced Sweet Million in New York. Games are $2 each. The first drawing took place on June 16. The game has since expanded; as of July 1, 2019, the game is offered by nine state lotteries and is drawn nightly.

Players choose 5 of 60 numbers in one field, and 1 of 4 green "Cash Ball" numbers in the second field. Drawings are held live from New Jersey every evening at 9pm Eastern Time on Livestream. The top prize is $1,000 per day for life, while second prize is $1,000 per week; both annuity tiers have a cash option.

Unusually, New Jersey requires players to choose cash or annuity when playing Cash4Life, instead of after winning. The cash option (if chosen) is binding, while an annuity ticket can be changed to cash after winning. On May 15, 2017, Doubler NJ (available only in New Jersey, hence, the name of the feature) can be added to each Cash4Life play for $1 extra. All non-"for Life" prizes double winnings. Doubler NJ applies to each $3 play on a ticket.

Mega Millions

On September 6, 1996, six lotteries began a multi-jurisdictional game, then known as The Big Game. In May 1999, the New Jersey Lottery became its first additional member. The game became known as The Big Game Mega Millions in May 2002; a short time later, The Big Game was dropped from the name. Mega Millions' starting jackpots is $15 million; a cash option is available.

On January 31, 2010, many MUSL members (until then offering only Powerball) joined Mega Millions; likewise, most Mega Millions members added Powerball; New Jersey offered both games as of the cross-sell expansion date.

The Megaplier option, initially available only in Texas, became available to Mega Millions players in New Jersey during January 2011, the deadline for the then 43 Mega Millions members to offer the Megaplier.

Mega Millions currently is played in 44 states, the District of Columbia, and the U.S. Virgin Islands. Mega Millions is drawn live, usually from Atlanta.

Powerball

Powerball is a multi-lottery game which began in 1992. On October 13, 2009, the Mega Millions consortium and Multi-State Lottery Association (MUSL) reached an agreement in principle to cross-sell Mega Millions and Powerball in U.S. lottery jurisdictions. On January 7, 2010, the New Jersey Lottery announced that it would join Powerball, effective January 31, 2010; on that date, the 33 MUSL members were joined by 12 lotteries, including New Jersey's, that offered Mega Millions, although some of the 45 lotteries did not add the "other" game on that date.

On March 13, 2010, New Jersey became the first previously Mega Millions-only jurisdiction to produce a jackpot ticket for Powerball after the cross-sell expansion. The annuity value of the jackpot was over $211 million; the ticket was sold in Morris Plains.

Powerball's basic game has always had a $1 price; a game with the Power Play option (introduced in 2001) costs $2. On January 15, 2012, the most recent format change for Powerball included a price increase; games are $2 each, or $3 with Power Play. The minimum jackpot was doubled, to $40 million; a second-prize game (matching all five white balls, but not also the Powerball) wins $1 million, or $2 million if Power Play was selected.

Powerball is drawn live, usually from Florida; its home base was Iowa until 2008.

Cash/annuity jackpot choice
Unusually, for Pick-6 (as well as for Cash4Life, Mega Millions, and Powerball within New Jersey), players must choose cash or annuity when playing, instead of after winning. The cash option, if chosen, is legally binding; however, a New Jersey-generated annuity ticket that wins an annuity prize in any of these four games can be changed to cash. Such winners are given a 60-day period upon claiming in which to make the choice.

There is no annuity option in Jersey Cash 5, as its jackpot shares are paid in lump sum.

Instant Games
Since July 17, 1975, the New Jersey has offered numerous scratchcard games, called "Instant Games", with various price points, prizes, formats and themes.

Fast Play
The Lottery offered a form of instant win game known as Instant Match. Available as a $1 add-on to Pick-3, Pick-4 and Jersey Cash 5 tickets, the lottery terminal's random number generator produced a same-sized set of numbers to the main game. If any of the randomly generated numbers match the ticket's chosen numbers, the player wins the indicated prize amount.

In 2015, this was replaced by a series of games known as Fast Play, which are instant games similar to a scratchcard, but generated by the lottery terminal. Cost and prize values vary between games. One game, Jersey Jackpot features a progressive jackpot.

Retired draw games

5 Card Lotto/Cash 
The original version of the game was called 5 Card Lotto, and was offered from January 11, 1988, to September 18, 1990. It was New Jersey Lottery's response to the initial wave of terminal-based, all-cash, lottery games with a higher prize potential than those offered in Pick-3 and Pick-4 games. Rather than an all-number field, the game used 52 cards from a standard deck of playing cards. The game was drawn twice a week, on Tuesdays and Fridays. The winning combination was the five "cards" (actually marked balls) drawn. Although a "poker-themed" game, poker hands (four of a kind, full house, flush etc.) were not used to determine winning tickets. Instead, any game matching at least three of the five cards won a parimutuel prize. A ticket with any game matching all five cards won (or shared) the cash jackpot, which started at $200,000 and remained there until sales supported a higher top prize. Unusual at the time, 5 Card Lotto drawings were originally broadcast during the early afternoon, before being shifted to evenings.

The game was revived as 5 Card Cash and was offered from May 16, 2016, to May 3, 2020. Each play cost $2 per quick pick and offered two plays with the same set of terminal-generated playing cards. The first play was called "Win Now" which was an instant match game similar to the Fast Play games by matching the cards to a poker hand. Cash prizes ranged from $2 (for a pair of jacks or better) to $5000 (for a royal flush). The second play was called "Win Tonight", where a nightly jackpot drawing similar to the prior version of the game by matching at least two of the five cards drawn via random number generator would win a cash prize. Matching all five drawn cards won $100,000. An additional $1 bet called "All In" added to the prizes for the "Win Now" play, with a royal flush winning an additional progressive jackpot which started at $10,000, while a straight flush added 10% of the jackpot value to the prize.

New Jersey Lottery officially ended 5 Card Cash on October 5, 2020. The game had been temporarily suspended on May 4, 2020, due to the COVID-19 pandemic, but it never resumed play due to limited interest. On October 16, 2020, a new poker-themed version of the game was launched as a Fast Play Progressive game. In addition, any remaining amount for the "All In" prize pool was carried forward into the Fast Play progressive Jackpot.

Lotzee 
Lotzee (stylized LOTZEE) was a game offered from June 14, 1998, to September 13, 2003. Originally drawn once a week on Saturdays, it expanded with a Wednesday drawing before being discontinued. It was unpopular with players, who felt the rules, which featured a combination of player- and machine-selected numbers, were too complex and confusing. The top prize was $500,000 cash; although not a progressive jackpot, the prize was split if there were multiple winners.

A Player Could choose 4 out of 77 numbers numbered between 0 and 76.

Lottery Bingo 
Lottery Bingo was a Pick 5 style game. The release end dates are unknown. It was drawn only on Wednesdays. The player needed to chose 1 number from each letter columns(for example: B5 I24 N35 G52 and O75). The drawing was used one machine with 5 bingo cages(the first cage loaded with the B numbers, the second with the I numbers, and so on).

Monopoly Millionaires' Club 

Monopoly Millionaires' Club began on October 19, 2014. Its only jackpot winner was purchased in New Jersey. In December 2014, it was announced that due to low sales among the 23 members, sales of the game were to be suspended.

Drawings
The New Jersey Network (NJN) aired live televised drawings twice a day, seven days a week; midday at 12:57 p.m. ET, and nightly at 7:56 p.m. ET. Also, NJN aired the twice-weekly Mega Millions drawings at 10:59 p.m. every Tuesday and Friday night, as well as the Wednesday and Saturday Powerball drawings at the equivalent time. On July 1, 2011, the New Jersey Lottery became the first lottery in the nation to stream their drawings, live, from the New Jersey Lottery's headquarters on either the New Jersey Lottery's website or the New Jersey Lottery's Ustream channel. On September 6, 2011, drawings returned to broadcast on television on NJTV on a one-hour tape delay; the live drawings continue to be held at the Lottery's headquarters and broadcast online. On June 4, 2012, the live drawings from the New Jersey Lottery's Ustream channel moved to Livestream.

On January 1, 2013, the New Jersey Lottery drawings returned to broadcast television. The drawings were aired on WLNY (channel 10/55) in northern New Jersey, and WPSG-TV (channel 57), in southern New Jersey, both of which are owned by CBS. These are the first New Jersey Lottery drawings to be aired on commercial television. On July 1, 2014, the New Jersey Lottery live drawings moved to WPIX/channel 11 (New York City) and WPHL/channel 17 (Philadelphia), both of which are formerly owned by Tribune Broadcasting. On the same day, Erica Young (daughter of the late New Jersey Lottery draw host Hela Young) was introduced as the lottery's new draw host. On May 11, 2018, Erica Young hosted her final New Jersey Lottery drawing, taking on a new position with the Lottery. On the same day, the lottery aired its final televised midday drawings on WPIX & WPHL. On May 14, 2018, Lauren Berman was introduced as New Jersey Lottery's new draw host. On June 29, 2020, the New Jersey Lottery ceased to broadcast the evening drawings on WPIX and WPHL. The live drawings now stream exclusively on the New Jersey Lottery's website, Facebook page, Youtube channel and Livestream. In addition, the evening drawings moved from 7:57pm to 10:57pm. The Mega Millions and Powerball drawings continue to broadcast on WABC-TV and WXTV-DT (in Spanish) in New York and WTXF-TV in Philadelphia, although WABC-TV occasionally airs the Powerball drawings, particularly when the Powerball jackpot is significantly high. Due to the COVID-19 pandemic, the live drawings are hosted by unseen announcers.

All New Jersey Lottery drawings are held live from New Jersey Lottery Headquarters at Lawrence Park Complex in Trenton, New Jersey. Pick 3, Pick 4, Fireball, Jersey Cash 5, and Pick 6 are drawn in Studio A. The nightly Cash4Life drawings are held in Studio B. All NJ Lottery Drawings are under the observation of Mercadien P.C., a CPA and Asset Management firm.

‡ Live drawings take place on Livestream, NJ Lottery's Facebook page and Youtube channel.

† Live drawings take place on WABC-TV (on some occasions), WXTV-DT (in Spanish), and WTXF-TV.

L Live drawings take place only on Livestream.

Current hosts
Lauren Berman
Jacqueline Knox

Former hosts
Kaitlyn Cunning
Carmen Delia-Bryant
Joe DeRose
Renai Ellison
Foster Krupa
Dick LaRossa
Meredith Orlow (née Parker)
Erica Young
Hela Young

References

External links
 New Jersey Lottery official site

State lotteries of the United States
State agencies of New Jersey
Gambling in New Jersey